Bazaleti may refer to:
 Bazaleti Lake, a lake in Georgia
 , a village in Dusheti Municipality, Georgia
 , a village in Kharagauli Municipality, Georgia
 Bazaleti (historical area), a historical district in Georgia

See also
Battle of Bazaleti, a battle in Georgia in 1626
 

Geography of Georgia (country)